Albert Briand (5 August 1909 - 29 May 1966) was a French merchant and politician.

Family 
Briand is the brother-in-law of senator Henri Claireaux.

Biography 
He edited the weekly publication L'Écho des îles Saint-Pierre-et-Miquelon ("The Echo of the islands of Saint-Pierre and Miquelon").

With his brother-in-law Henri, he was a part of the collaborationist elite of Saint-Pierre, causing them both to be arrested in January 1944. Despite both being fervent anti-Gaullists, they became political adversaries.

Bibliography 
 André-Louis Sanguin, Le 101e département de la République française, in Norois n°110, 1981.

1909 births
1966 deaths
Saint Pierre and Miquelon politicians
Deputies of the 2nd National Assembly of the French Fifth Republic
Members of Parliament for Saint-Pierre-et-Miquelon